Gustavo de la Cruz (born 20 February 1954) is a Dominican Olympic boxer. He represented his country in the featherweight division at the 1976 Summer Olympics. He won his first bout against Rumen Peshev. He lost his second match against Bratislav Ristić.

1976 Olympic results
Below are the results of Gustavo de la Cruz, a featherweight boxer from the Dominican Republic who competed at the 1976 Montreal Olympics:

 Round of 64: bye
 Round of 32: defeated Rumen Peshov (Bulgaria) by decision, 5-0
 Round of 16: lost to Bratislav Ristic (Yugoslavia) by decision, 1-4

References

1954 births
Living people
Dominican Republic male boxers
Olympic boxers of the Dominican Republic
Boxers at the 1976 Summer Olympics
Featherweight boxers